Donie Shine (19 August 1951 – 28 April 2017) was a player and manager from County Roscommon. He was manager of the Roscommon county team in the early '90s. His son Donal played for Roscommon at all levels, winning Connacht and All-Ireland Minor Football Championship medals in 2006, as well as Connacht Under-21 Football Championship and Connacht Senior Football Championship in 2010.

References
 http://hoganstand.com/roscommon/ArticleForm.aspx?ID=25519
 http://hoganstand.com/roscommon/ArticleForm.aspx?ID=25837
 http://hoganstand.com/roscommon/ArticleForm.aspx?ID=40723

1951 births
Clan na Gael (Roscommon) Gaelic footballers
Gaelic football managers
Roscommon inter-county Gaelic footballers
2017 deaths
Place of birth missing